Baxu and the Giants is a 2019 Namibian 29-minute bilingual short fiction film directed by Florian Schott.

The film was produced by Andrew Botelle of MaMoKoBo Video and Research and was co-written and co-produced by Girley Jazama and directed, co-written and co-produced by Florian Schott.

It was commissioned by the Legal Assistance Centre of Namibia and funded by the Deutsche Gesellschaft für Internationale Zusammenarbeit (GIZ) Germany.

The brief was ‘to produce a film that sensitises teenagers about wildlife crime in Namibia' and the film aims to bring light to the ongoing and important issue of rhino poaching in Southern Africa.

Although the primary audience for the short film is the youth, the content is relevant to individuals of all ages, communities, and organisations affected by poaching, as well as general audiences around the world.

Writers Florian Schott and Girley Jazama chose to tell the story from the inside out - through the eyes of an innocent but toughened-by-life 9-year-old who is deeply rooted in nature and her own heritage. In fact, the name Baxu is short for "!Hubaxu", which means "I come from the soil".

Through this storytelling device which spans time between the age of hunters and gatherers until today, the aim is to reach an audience worldwide and for audiences to understand some of the underlying social issues in rural Namibia that can lead to poaching.

The film stars Camilla Jo-Ann Daries, Wafeeq /Narimab, Anna Louw, Steven Afrikaner, Robert Hara#gaeb, West Uarije and Ashwyn Mberi.

The film was regarded as one of the most anticipated Namibian films of 2019. It had its World Premiere on the 14th of September 2019 at the San Francisco Independent Short Film Festival, where it won the ‘Best Foreign Narrative” award, before being released in Windhoek, Namibia on 19 September 2019 at Ster-Kinekor Grove Mall.  It is the first Namibian film to stream on Netflix from the 30th of September 2020.

It received critical acclaim for directing, acting, editing, production design and cinematography. The film was screened at numerous international film festivals and won several awards and nominations.

Cast 

 Camilla Jo-Ann Daries as Baxu 
 Wafeeq /Narimab as Khata 
 Anna Louw as Ouma 
 Robert Hara#gaeb as Neighbour 
 West Uarije as Himba Tracker 
 Steven Afrikaner as Main Hunter 
 Ashwyn Mberi as Voice King Rhino

Crew 
Directed by: Florian Schott

Written by: Florian Schott & Girley Jazama

Produced by: Andrew Botelle

Co-Produced by: Girley Jazama & Florian Schott

Executive Producers: 	Willem Odendaal (Legal Assistance Centre Namibia) & Clive Johnson (B2Gold Corp.)

Director of Photography: Kit Hoffmann

Editor: Robert Scott

Production Designer: Tanya Stroh

Costume Designer / Make-Up Artist: Kulan Ganes

Music Composers: Lize Ehlers, Karl Ehlers & Imms Nicolau

Sound Designer: Wojtek Majewski

VFX Supervisor: Inna Goroh

Production Manager: Girley Jazama

First Assistant Director: Fellemon Ndongo

Unit Manager: Gerson Gawanab

Synopsis 
Baxu, a 9-year-old girl in touch with nature and tradition but toughened by life in poverty, lives with her street-smart older brother Khata and alcoholic grandmother in a village in Damaraland, North West Namibia.

They live a peaceful life until strange men show up and cause change in the village. First the neighbour starts acting suspicious, then Baxu notices changes in her own household.

Keen on finding out what Khata is hiding from her, Baxu investigates and learns that her brother started poaching, in order to improve his family's living conditions.

Baxu has to make a tough decision - will she stay quiet or will she listen to the rhinos, the giants of the Savannah, who she talks to in her dreams and risk losing the people she loves the most?

Production 
The 29-minute short fiction film was produced by Andrew Botelle of MaMoKoBo Video and Research and was directed, co-written and co-produced by Florian Schott and co-written and co-produced by Girley Jazama.

The two-week production was filmed in Tubuses in the Erongo Region, Torra Conservancy and the interiors in Windhoek, Namibia.

It was commissioned by the Legal Assistance Centre of Namibia and funded by the Deutsche Gesellschaft für Internationale Zusammenarbeit (GIZ) Germany.

The brief was ‘to produce a film that sensitises teenagers about wildlife crime in Namibia' and the film aims to bring light to the ongoing and important issue of rhino poaching in Southern Africa.

Release 
On 19 September 2019, six months after filming was completed, 'Baxu and the Giants' was launched in Namibia's capital city, Windhoek, with 450 attendees, including VIPs, NGO and Government representatives, business leaders, members of the diplomatic core, members of the general public as well as the cast and crew of the film. B2Gold Namibia funded this VIP premiere in Namibia.

Distribution 
Once production was complete, the producer team intentionally targeted the international film festival circuit to raise the public profile of the final film and to raise more funding for marketing and distribution.

The brief for the film from the Legal Assistance Centre of Namibia was to produce a film intended for rural Namibian audiences as well as audiences in other African countries that have issues with poaching and wildlife conflict - to share experiences.

The producer team purposefully formed alliances and partnerships with key Namibian organisations, government departments, businesses and individuals - this ensured that the film was used and distributed by these other individuals and organisations as well.

The producer team thus did not have to do all the marketing and distribution of the final film, but were greatly assisted by many other partner organisations.

The producer team could then focus on managing and helping others organise film screenings in their own areas for their own audiences. The final film enjoyed the following distribution and (marketing) platforms for different audiences:

 Screenings at Ster-Kinekor Grove Mall in the capital city
 Free screenings to schools in Windhoek via the LAC mobile screening team
 Screenings at B2Gold Education centre via B2Gold Namibia
 Legal Assistance Centre mobile cinema screenings in rural areas of North East and North West Namibia 
 Screenings in Swakopmund via the Scientific Society of Namibia
 Ministry of the Environment & Tourism - conferences, workshops and alike
 Namibia Film Commission screening as part of the 2019 Namibian Theatre and Film Awards
 Mobile cinema tour in Windhoek and North West Namibia by the film producers

Awards 
The film won multiple international awards, including the award for Best Foreign Narrative at the San Francisco Independent Short Film Festival, three Namibian Theatre- and Film Awards (including Best Female Actor for 10-year-old Camilla Jo-Ann Daries), the award for Best Director at the Dreamanila International Film Festival, three international Cinematography Awards and it was nominated for Best Humanitarian Film at the RapidLion South African International Film Festival and Best Narrative Short Film at the Pan African Film Festival in Los Angeles, USA where it was also screened for hundreds of school children.

Nominations 
NOMINEE Best Humanitarian Film - 2020 RapidLion Awards

NOMINEE Best Narrative Short Film - 2020 Pan African Film Festival

NOMINEE Best Short Film – 2020 African Movie Academy Awards

Official Selection 
2019 Africa International Film Festival (AFRIFF), Nigeria

2019 AfryKamera African Film Festival, Poland

2019 Wallachia Int’l Film Festival, Romania

2019 NexGn International Short Film Festival, USA

2019 Silicon Valley African Film Festival, USA

2019 The Hague Global Cinema Festival, Netherlands

2019 Indie Visions Film Festival, USA

2020 Barbados Independent Film Festival, Barbados

2020 Toronto Black Film Festival, Canada

2020 Children’s Film Festival Seattle, USA

2020 Beeston Film Festival, UK

2020 Eko International Film Festival, Nigeria

2020 The Roxbury International Film Festival, USA

2020 Makhanda Film Festival, South Africa

2020 Global Indie Film Fest, USA

2020 Melkbos Short Film Festival, South Africa

2020 Chambal International Film Festival, India

2020 Under the Stars International Film Festival, India

2020 Cine Invisible Festival Internacional, Spain

2020 Lahore International Children’s Film Festival, Pakistan

2020 Cinekid Festival, Netherlands

2020 KUKI International Short Film Festival, Germany

2020 International Kids Film Festival, India

2020 12N, 61W Film Festival, Grenada

2020 MosFilmFest, Russia

2020 Cape Town International Film Market & Festival

Platforms that ‘Baxu and the Giants’ is playing on 
Netflix (Worldwide)

AfroLandTV (Worldwide excluding Africa)

UK Film Channel (Worldwide excluding Africa)

‘Baxu and the Giants’ Promotional 
To date, the ‘Baxu and the Giants’ film project created the following products:

 ‘Baxu and the Giants’ T-shirts
 ‘Baxu and the Giants’ DVDS
 ‘Baxu and the Giants’ music soundtrack: https://soundcloud.com/user-258696759-944843444
 A new ‘Baxu and the Giants’ Song - “Sada Dî Tama Hâ’:  https://soundcloud.com/user-258696759-944843444
 A new ‘Baxu and the Giants’ Music video “Sada Dî Tama Hâ: https://www.youtube.com/watch?v=Ej7Bz5PZcWM

Be the generation that ends Rhino poaching 
For more information on how you can get involved in Rhino Conservation in Namibia please visit these organizations:

Namibia Wildlife Protection: https://www.namwildlifeprotect.com/

Rhino Momma Project: https://www.rhinomomma.com/

Save The Rhino Trust Namibia: http://www.savetherhinotrust.org/

Mount Etjo Rhino Trust: https://www.mount-etjo.com/rhino-trust

Legal Assistance Centre Namibia: http://www.lac.org.na/

References

External links 

 ‘Baxu and the Giants’ website: https://www.baxuandthegiants.com/

2019 films
2019 short films
2019 drama films
2019 multilingual films
Namibian short films
Namibian drama films